Adventure in Vienna (German: Abenteuer in Wien) is a 1952 Austrian crime thriller film directed by Emil E. Reinert and starring Gustav Fröhlich, Cornell Borchers and Adrienne Gessner. It is an adaptation of the 1933 novel I Was Jack Mortimer by Alexander Lernet-Holenia. A separate English-language version Stolen Identity was also produced.

The film's sets were designed by the art directors Fritz Jüptner-Jonstorff and Fritz Moegle. It was shot at the Schönbrunn Studios in Vienna and on location across the city. The costumes were designed by Nadja Tiller, better known as an actress.

Synopsis
The story takes place over New Year's Eve in Vienna where a taxi driver without papers is tempted to assume the identity of another man.

Cast
 Gustav Fröhlich as Toni Sponer 
 Cornell Borchers as Karin Manelli 
 Francis Lederer as Claude Manelli 
 Inge Konradi as Marie 
 Hermann Erhardt as Ferdl Heintl 
 Adrienne Gessner as Frau Anna Fraser 
 Egon von Jordan as Krüger 
 Manfred Inger as Polizeiinspektor 
 Fritz Eckhardt as Portier im Goldenen Löwen 
 Alexander Kerst as 2.Polizist auf der Wache 
 Trude Marlen as Ehefrau auf dem Kommissariat 
 Karl Schwetter as Ehemann auf dem Kommissariat 
 Michael Kehlmann as Passfälscher 
 Franz Marischka as Passkontrolleur am Flughafen 
 Wolfgang Glück as Porschefahrer 
 Gerda Neubauer  as Frau im Porsche 
 Karl Farkas as Ober in der Bar 
 Guido Wieland as 'Geldeintreiber' vom Goldenen Löwen 
 Gisela Wilke as Alte Frau im Kaiserpanorama
 Fred Solm as 1.Polizist auf der Wache 
 Louis Ousted as John Milton 
 Paul Pranger as Portier im Goldenen Löwen 
 Reinhold Siegert as Mann bei der Telefonzelle 
 Helmut Janatsch as Polizist bei der Hausdurchsuchung 
 Fritz Krenn as Mann an der Lufthafenauskunft 
 Maria Gerngroß as Stewardess 
 Pepi Glöckner-Kramer as Alte Frau im Kaiserpanorama 
 Franz Böheim as Betrunkener mit Luftballon 
 Rosa Albach-Retty
 Ulrich Bettac
 Heinz Conrads
 Hugo Gottschlich
 Hans Hagen as Dirigent 
 Dorothea Neff
 Milan von Kamare
 Ernst Waldbrunn

See also
 I Was Jack Mortimer (1935)

References

Bibliography 
 Fritsche, Maria. Homemade Men in Postwar Austrian Cinema: Nationhood, Genre and Masculinity. Berghahn Books, 2013.

External links 
 

1952 films
1950s crime thriller films
Austrian crime thriller films
1950s German-language films
Films directed by Emil-Edwin Reinert
Films shot at Schönbrunn Studios
Films shot in Vienna
Films set in Vienna
Films based on Austrian novels
Remakes of German films
Austrian black-and-white films
Film noir
Films about identity theft
Austrian multilingual films
1950s multilingual films
Films about taxis